Luca Ghini (Casalfiumanese, 1490 – Bologna, 4 May 1556) was an Italian physician and botanist, notable as the creator of the first recorded herbarium, as well as the first botanical garden in Europe.

Biography
Ghini was born in Casalfiumanese, son of a notary, and studied medicine at the University of Bologna. By 1527 he was lecturing there on medicinal plants, and eventually became a professor.

He moved to Pisa in 1544, while maintaining his home in Bologna. He created the first herbarium (hortus siccus) in that year, drying plants while pressing them between pieces of paper, then gluing them to cardboard. None of his herbaria survive although the one by his student Gherardo Cibo made around 1532 survives. 1544 also saw the establishment of a garden for live plants, which became known as the Orto botanico di Pisa.

Ghini published no significant botanical work of his own, but was noted as a teacher many of whose students went on to significant careers, including Cesalpino (his successor as the director of the botanical garden) and Pietro Andrea Mattioli, the latter of which he helped by travelling around the Mediterranean and Near East in search for plants that matched the mystifying descriptions of Dioscorides. A Placiti revealing Ghini's methods was published posthumously.

References

Bibliography 

 
 
 

1490 births
1556 deaths
People from the Province of Bologna
Botanists with author abbreviations
16th-century Italian botanists
Pre-Linnaean botanists
16th-century Italian physicians
Academic staff of the University of Pisa